Jason Q. Bohm is a United States Marine Corps major general who serves as the Inspector General of the Marine Corps. He served as the Commanding General of the Marine Corps Recruiting Command from July 17, 2020, to July 21, 2022. Previously, he served as the Chief of Staff of the Naval Striking and Support Forces NATO from June 2018 to July 2020.

He is the author of the book From the Cold War to ISIL: One Marine’s Journey, which was published in 2019.

References

External links

Year of birth missing (living people)
Living people
Place of birth missing (living people)
United States Marine Corps generals